The canton de Roujan is a former canton in the Arrondissement of Béziers, Hérault department, and Languedoc-Roussillon region of France. It had 9,414 inhabitants (2012). It was disbanded following the French canton reorganisation which came into effect in March 2015. It consisted of 11 communes, which joined the canton of Cazouls-lès-Béziers in 2015.

Composition 
The canton comprised the following communes:

 Fos
 Fouzilhon
 Gabian
 Magalas
 Margon
 Montesquieu
 Neffiès
 Pouzolles
 Roquessels
 Roujan
 Vailhan

Administration

Gallery

References 

Roujan
2015 disestablishments in France
States and territories disestablished in 2015